Canada competed in the 1998 Winter Paralympics in Nagano, Japan from March 5 to 14, 1998. 32 athletes were sent by the Canadian Paralympic Committee to compete in three sports. Canada won a record of 15 medals at that time and finished fifteenth on the medal table.

Medalists

See also
Canada at the 1998 Winter Olympics
Canada at the Paralympics

References

External links
Canadian Paralympic Committee official website
International Paralympic Committee official website

Nations at the 1998 Winter Paralympics
1998
Paralympics